Joanna is a female given name.

Joanna may also refer to:

Films
 Joanna (1925 film), a lost American silent film
 Joanna (1968 film), a 1968 British drama film
 Joanna (2010 film), directed by Feliks Falk
 Joanna (2013 film), a documentary film nominated for an Academy Award
Joanna, a goanna in the film The Rescuers Down Under

Songs
"Joanna", by Cris Williamson
"Joanna" (JoJo song)
"Joanna", by Kim Larsen
"Joanna" (Kool & the Gang song)
"Joanna" (Scott Walker song)
"Joanna (Shut Up!)", by Crazy Loop
"Joanna", by Superpitcher
"Joanna", by Little Comets

Maritime vessels
Johanna (East Indiaman) or Joanna, a ship of the British East India Company lost in 1682
, a United States Navy patrol boat in commission from 1917 to 1920

Places
In Australia
Joanna, South Australia

In the United States
Joanna, Missouri, a ghost town
Joanna, Pennsylvania, an unincorporated community
Joanna, South Carolina, a census-designated place
Lake Joanna, Florida

Other uses
Joanna (opera), an 1802 opera by Étienne Méhul, libretto by Benoît-Joseph Marsollier
Joanna (skipper), a genus of butterflies
Joanna (singer), Brazilian singer Maria de Fátima Gomes Nogueira (born 1957) 
Joanna (typeface), a serif typeface designed by Eric Gill

See also
 Johanna (disambiguation)
 Joanne (disambiguation)